A list of films produced in the Soviet Union in 1965 (see 1965 in film).

1965

External links
 Soviet films of 1965 at the Internet Movie Database

1965
Soviet
Films